Thomas Christy Oliphant (born 21 August 1990 in Tarporley, Cheshire) is a British racing driver.

Oliphant currently competes in TCR Australia for Ashley Seward Motorsport.

Oliphant won the 2015 Ginetta GT4 Supercup title, is a two-time race winner in the British Touring Car Championship, has taken podium finishes in the Porsche Carrera Cup Great Britain and was a title contender in the Porsche GT3 Cup Challenge Middle East.

Racing record

Career summary

† As Oliphant was a guest driver, he was ineligible to score points.

Complete British GT Championship results
(key) (Races in bold indicate pole position) (Races in italics indicate fastest lap)

Complete British Touring Car Championship results
(key) (Races in bold indicate pole position – 1 point awarded just in first race; races in italics indicate fastest lap – 1 point awarded all races; * signifies that driver led race for at least one lap – 1 point given all races)

References

External links
 https://www.tomoliphantracing.com/

1990 births
Living people
British Touring Car Championship drivers
British GT Championship drivers
English racing drivers
British racing drivers
Porsche Carrera Cup GB drivers
People from Tarporley
Ginetta GT4 Supercup drivers
Formula Renault BARC drivers
Porsche Supercup drivers
Walter Lechner Racing drivers
BMW M drivers